Gina Sillitti (born April 5, 1978) is an American Democratic Party politician who currently represents New York State Assembly district 16, which includes Port Washington, Manhasset, Great Neck, North Hills, East Hills, Flower Hill, Old Westbury, Roslyn Estates, Roslyn Heights, Herricks and Lake Success of Nassau County on Long Island.

Personal life 

Sillitti grew up in Mount Sinai, New York and Florida. She earned a bachelor's degree in political science from the University of Georgia in 2000. She moved to Manorhaven in 2012. She is married to Kevin Clemency.

Before running for office, she spent nearly two decades in public service, starting at the Nassau County Legislature.

Politics 

Sillitti began her political career working in the office of Nassau County Legislator Dave Mejias. She then worked in the Department of Community Services for the Town of North Hempstead, being appointed as deputy commissioner in 2010. She later worked as director of legislator affairs and deputy chief of staff for Town Supervisor Jon Kaiman.

From 2015 to 2020, Sillitti was the human resources director for the Nassau County Board of Elections.

Sillitti was nominated at the Nassau County Democratic Committee Convention on February 11, 2020, after Assemblyman Anthony D'Urso announced he would be retiring.

Sillitti ran on a platform to increase state funding for local schools and roads, reducing property taxes, and protecting Long Island Sound and drinking water. She also advocated for stimulus relief from the COVID-19 pandemic and emphasized she would be accessible to her constituents.

In late February 2021, after the Andrew Cuomo sexual harassment allegations became public, Sillitti was among a group of assemblywomen who issued a statement calling for an independent investigator to be appointed by Attorney General Letitia James. She later pushed back against calls for his immediate resignation, being among 23 Democratic assemblywomen to say the attorney general's investigation should be completed first, in a split among New York Democrats.

References

External links 
 Biography at the New York State Assembly 
 Ballotpedia profile 

Living people
Democratic Party members of the New York State Assembly
University of Georgia alumni
Women state legislators in New York (state)
21st-century American politicians
21st-century American women politicians
People from Port Washington, New York
Politicians from Nassau County, New York
American people of Italian descent
1978 births